Johnny Hunter (21 July 1925 – 7 May 1980) was an Australian rugby league footballer who played in the 1940s and 1950s. He played in Sydney's NSWRFL Premiership for the Eastern Suburbs club, with whom he won the 1945 NSWRFL Premiership, as well as in England for Huddersfield, with whom he won the 1953 Challenge Cup.

The 1945 NSWRFL season was Hunter's first, and at the end of it he played at centre in Eastern Suburbs' Premiership final victory. In January 1947 Hunter along with Eastern Suburbs teammate Lionel Cooper signed to play with English club Huddersfield.

Hunter scored 16-tries during the 1948–49 Northern Rugby Football League season, his first in England, breaking the record for a  set by Jim Sullivan. During the 1949–50 Northern Rugby Football League season Hunter played a fullback in Huddersfield's 2–20 defeat by Wigan in the Rugby Football League Championship Final at Maine Road, Manchester on Saturday 13 May 1950. Also while in England, Hunter played eight matches for the Other Nationalities rugby league team, and one match for the British Empire. He continued playing for Huddersfield until 1955.

Hunter died in 1980.

References

External links

1925 births
1980 deaths
Australian rugby league players
British Empire rugby league team players
Huddersfield Giants players
Other Nationalities rugby league team players
Rugby league players from Sydney
Rugby league fullbacks
Sydney Roosters players
Date of death unknown